Löchgau is a municipality in the Ludwigsburg district of Baden-Württemberg, Germany.

History
Löchgau was first mentioned in a document dated to between 1105 and 1120 as "Lochenheim". A noble family document as having been influential in the area since the early 12th century sold their share of the village to the Prince-Bishop of Speyer, who turned over the property to Maulbronn Monastery. The Margraviate of Baden made further donations of nearby property to Maulbronn in 1225, as did  in 1260. In 1416, fully half of Löchgau by the Venningen family to the Margrave of Baden, which was then pledged to the Electoral Palatinates in 1463, to the Duchy of Württemberg in 1504, and then to Baden again in 1529, and then finally and once again to Württemberg in 1595 along with Besigheim. Württemberg acquired the other half of the village from its various owners from 1407 to 1506. This district, too, was dissolved in 1938 and replaced with a new one, Landkreis Ludwigsburg. Löchgau doubled in size in the years after World War II.

Geography
The municipality (Gemeinde) of Löchgau is located in the district of Ludwigsburg, in Baden-Württemberg, one of the 16 States of the Federal Republic of Germany. Löchgau is physically located in  the Neckar. Elevation above sea level in the municipal area ranges from a high of  Normalnull (NN) to a low of  NN.

Politics
Löchgau has one borough (Ortseil), Löchgau, and two villages: Petershöfe and Weißenhof. Löchgau is in a municipal association with Besigheim.

Coat of arms
Löchgau's coat of arms shows a large, yellow "L" next to a six-pointed star of the same color upon a field of blue. The "L" is a local motif that is documented as early as 1684. The star accompanying it first appeared in 1757. A corresponding municipal flag was issued by the Ludwigsburg district office on 12 March 1980.

Transportation
Löchgau is connected to Germany's network of roadways by its local Landesstraßen and Kreisstraßen. Local public transportation is provided by the Verkehrs- und Tarifverbund Stuttgart.

References

External links

  (in German)

Ludwigsburg (district)
Württemberg